A Man's Word (German:Eines Mannes Wort) is a 1919 German silent film directed by Erik Lund and starring Bruno Kaster.

References

External links

1919 films
Films of the Weimar Republic
German silent feature films
Films directed by Erik Lund
German black-and-white films
1910s German films